Alien visitation is the idea that intelligent extraterrestrial beings have visited Earth. Claimed forms of such visitations include;
 Alien abduction, kidnapping by aliens
 Ancient astronaut, alien influence of major historical events
 Close encounter, observation of alien vessels
 Contactee, a person who claims to have been contacted by aliens